Fort Erie was a pair of adjacent Grand Trunk (partnered with the Canadian National Railway) and Michigan Central (succeeded by the New York Central) railroad stations in Fort Erie, Ontario. In earlier years, the Wabash Railroad served the Grand Trunk station as well via traffic rights. 

The Canadian National Railway trains from the station consisted of a single six day a week mixed train between Fort Erie and Stratford, Ontario. This train was eliminated in the latter 1950s.

In mid-20th century, the New York Central's New England Wolverine, a Detroit–Boston counterpart to the Wolverine, and the Detroit–New York City Empire State Express, as well as unnamed Hamilton, Ontario–Welland, ON–Buffalo trains, and Detroit–Buffalo trains, made stops at the New York Central station.

Amtrak restored service through the station in 1974, until the rerouting of the Niagara Rainbow train service in 1978. The station has since been demolished.

References

Railway stations closed in 1981
Former Amtrak stations in Canada
Former Wabash Railroad stations
Canadian National Railway stations in Ontario